Missouri is a state located in the Midwestern United States. In Missouri, cities are classified into three types:  3rd Class, 4th Class, and those under constitutional charters. A few older cities are incorporated under legislative charters (Carrollton, Chillicothe, LaGrange, Liberty, Miami, Missouri City, and Pleasant Hill) which are no longer allowed. (Carthage is also a Charter City and Charter Cities are by constitution not legislation and are still allowed to this day). The level at which they incorporate is determined by their population when they incorporate. They do not change if they gain or lose in population, unless a vote is held by the people.

A municipality incorporates as a 4th Class city if the population is between 500 and 2,999 (under 500, it may incorporate as a village – see list of villages in Missouri). It may incorporate as a 3rd Class city if the population is between 3,000 and 29,999. There is more flexibility in government for 3rd Class cities than 4th Class.

Cities under constitutional charters may operate under any form of municipal government if it is enacted in the city's charter.

Largest cities

Population data based on 2019 estimates.

Alphabetical listing

A-C
A

Adrian
Advance
Albany
Annapolis
Anderson
Appleton City
Archie
Arnold
Ash Grove
Ashland
Aurora
Ava

B

Bagnell
Ballwin
Barnhart
Baring
Barnard
Barnett
Bates City
Battlefield
Beaufort
Bel-Nor
Bel-Ridge
Bell City
Bella Villa
Belle
Bellefontaine Neighbors
Bellflower
Belgrade
Belton
Benton
Berger
Berkeley
Bernie
Bertrand
Bethany
Beverly Hills
Bevier
Billings
Birch Tree
Bismarck
Black Jack
Blackburn
Blackwater
Blairstown
Bland
Bloomfield
Bloomsdale
Blue Springs
Bogard
Bolckow
Bolivar
Bonne Terre
Boonville
Bosworth
Bourbon
Bowling Green
Bragg City
Brandsville
Branson
Branson West
Brashear
Braymer
Breckenridge
Breckenridge Hills
Brentwood
Bridgeton
Bronaugh
Brookfield
Browning
Brownington
Brunswick
Bucklin
Buckner
Buffalo
Bunceton
Bunker
Burlington Junction
Butler
Byrnes Mill

C

Cabool
Cainsville
Caledonia
Calverton Park
Calhoun
California
Callao
Camden
Camden Point
Camdenton
Cameron
Campbell
Canalou
Canton
Cape Girardeau
Cardwell
Carl Junction
Carrollton
Carterville
Carthage
Caruthersville
Carytown
Cassville
Catron
Center
Centerview
Centerville
Centralia
Chaffee
Chamois
Charlack
Charleston
Charmwood
Chesterfield
Chilhowee
Chillicothe
Chula
Clarence
Clark
Clarksburg
Clarksdale
Clarkson Valley
Clarksville
Clarkton
Claycomo
Clayton
Clearmont
Cleveland
Clever
Clifton Hill
Climax Springs
Clinton
Coffey
Cole Camp
Columbia
Commerce
Conception Junction
Concordia
Conway
Cool Valley
Cooter
Corder
Cottleville
Country Club
Country Club Hills
Country Club Village
Cowgill
Craig
Crane
Creighton
Crestwood
Creve Coeur
Crocker
Cross Timbers
Crystal City
Crystal Lake Park
Crystal Lakes
Cuba
Curryville

D-F
D

Dardenne Prairie
Darlington
Dearborn
Deepwater
De Kalb
Dellwood
Delta
Des Arc
Desloge
De Soto
Des Peres
De Witt
Dexter
Diamond
Dixon
Doniphan
Doolittle
Downing
Drexel
Dudley
Duenweg
Duquesne

E

Eagleville
East Lynne
Easton
East Prairie
Edgar Springs
Edgerton
Edina
Edmundson
Eldon
El Dorado Springs
Ellington
Ellisville
Ellsinore
Elmer
Elmo
Elsberry
Eminence
Emma
Essex
Ethel
Eugene
Eureka
Everton
Ewing
Excelsior Estates
Excelsior Springs
Exeter

F

Fairfax
Fair Grove
Fair Play
Fairview
Farber
Farmington
Fayette
Fenton
Ferguson
Festus
Fillmore
Fisk
Fleming
Flint Hill City
Flordell Hills
Florissant
Foley
Fordland
Forest City
Foristell
Forsyth
Frankford
Franklin
Fredericktown
Freeman
Freistatt
Fremont Hills 
Frohna
Frontenac
Fulton

G-K
G

Gainesville
Galena
Gallatin
Galt
Garden City
Gasconade
Gerald
Gideon
Gilliam
Gilman City
Gladstone
Glasgow
Glenaire
Glendale
Golden City
Goodman
Gower
Graham
Grain Valley
Granby
Grandin
Grandview
Grant City
Greencastle
Green City
Greendale
Greenfield
Green Park
Green Ridge
Greentop
Greenville
Greenwood

H

Hale
Hallsville
Hamilton
Hanley Hills
Hannibal
Hardin
Harris
Harrisonville
Harper
Hartville
Hawk Point
Hayti
Hayti Heights
Hazelwood
Henrietta
Herculaneum
Hermann
Hermitage
Higbee
Higginsville
High Hill
Highlandville
Hillsboro
Hillsdale
Holcomb
Holden
Holland
Hollister
Holt
Holts Summit
Homestown
Hopkins
Hornersville
Houston
Houstonia
Houston Lake
Howardville
Humansville
Hume
Hunnewell
Huntleigh
Huntsville
Hurdland
Hurley

I

Iconium
Iberia
Imperial
Independence
Irondale
Iron Mountain Lake
Ironton

J

Jackson
Jamesport
Jamestown
Jasper
Jefferson City
Jennings
Jonesburg
Joplin

K

Kahoka
Kansas City
Kearney
Kennett
Keytesville
Kidder
Kimberling City
Kimmswick
King City
Kingston
Kingsville
Kinloch
Kirbyville
Kirksville
Kirkwood
Knob Noster
Knob Lick
Knox City
Koshkonong

L-N
L

La Belle
Laclede
Laddonia
Ladue
La Grange
Lake Annette
Lake Lafayette
Lake Lotawana
Lake Ozark
Lake St. Louis
Lakeshire
Lakeside
Lake Tapawingo
Lake Waukomis
Lake Winnebago
Lamar
La Monte
Lanagan
Lancaster
La Plata
Laredo
La Russell
Lathrop
Lawson
Leadington
Leadwood
Leawood
Lebanon
Lee's Summit
Leeton
Levasy
Lexington
Lewistown
Liberal
Liberty
Licking
Lilbourn
Lincoln
Linn
Linn Creek
Linneus
Lockwood
Lohman
Lone Jack
Louisiana
Lowry City
Lucerne
Lupus

M

Macks Creek
Macon
Madison
Maitland
Malden
Malta Bend
Mammoth
Manchester
Mansfield
Maplewood
Marble Hill
Marceline
Marionville
Marlborough
Marquand
Marshall
Marshfield
Marston
Marthasville
Martinsburg
Maryland Heights
Maryville
Matthews
Maysville
Mayview
McFall
McKittrick
Meadville
Memphis
Mendon
Mercer
Merriam Woods
Meta
Mexico
Miami
Middletown
Milan
Miller
Mindenmines
Miner
Missouri City
Moberly
Mokane
Moline Acres
Monett
Monroe City
Montgomery City
Montrose
Morehouse
Morley
Morrison
Morrisville
Mosby
Moscow Mills
Mound City
Mountain Grove
Mountain View
Mount Vernon

N

Napoleon
Naylor
Neck City
Neelyville
Nelson
Neosho
Nevada
New Bloomfield
Newburg
New Cambria
New Florence
New Franklin
New Hampton
New Haven
New London
New Madrid
New Melle
Newtown
Niangua
Nixa
Noel
Norborne
Normandy
North Kansas City
Northmoor
Northwoods
Norwood
Novelty
Novinger

O-R
O

Oak Grove
Oakland
Oakville
Odessa
O'Fallon
Old Monroe
Olivette
Olympian Village
Oran
Oregon
Oronogo
Orrick
Osage Beach
Osborn
Osceola
Otterville
Overland
Owensville
Ozark

P

Pacific
Pagedale
Palmyra
Paris
Park Hills
Parkville
Parma
Parnell
Pasadena Hills
Pattonsburg
Peculiar
Perkins
Perry
Perryville
Pevely
Piedmont
Pierce City
Pilot Grove
Pilot Knob
Pine Lawn
Pineville
Platte City
Platte Woods
Plattsburg
Pleasant Hill
Pleasant Hope
Pleasant Valley
Polo
Pomona
Poplar Bluff
Portage Des Sioux
Portageville
Potosi
Powell
Powersville
Prairie Home
Princeton
Pulaskifield
Purcell
Purdin
Purdy
Puxico

Q

Quarles
Queen City
Quitman
Qulin

R

Randolph
Ravenwood
Raymore
Raytown
Rea
Reeds
Reeds Spring
Republic
Revere
Rich Hill
Richland
Richmond
Richmond Heights
Ridgeway
Risco
Rivermines
Riverside
Riverview
Rocheport
Rockaway Beach
Rock Hill
Rocky Mount
Rock Port
Rockville
Rogersville
Rolla
Rosebud
Rosendale
Russellville

S-W
S

Saint Ann
Saint Charles
Saint Clair
Saint James
Saint John
Saint Joseph
Saint Louis
Saint Martins
Saint Mary
Saint Paul
Saint Peters
Saint Robert
Saint Thomas
Sainte Genevieve
Salem
Salisbury
Sarcoxie
Savannah
Schell City
Scott City
Sedalia
Seligman
Senath
Seneca
Seymour
Shelbina
Shelbyville
Sheldon
Sheridan
Shrewsbury
Sikeston
Skidmore
Slater
Smithton
Smithville
South Gorin
Sparta
Spickard
Spokane
Springfield
Squires
Stanberry
Steele
Steelville
Stewartsville
Stockton
Stotts City
Stoutland
Stover
Strafford
Strasburg
Sturgeon
Sugar Creek
Sumner
Sunrise Beach
Sullivan
Summersville
Sunset Hills
Sweet Springs
Syracuse

T

Tallapoosa
Taos
Tarkio
Thayer
Tina
Tipton
Town and Country
Tracy
Tecumseh
Tindall
Trenton
Trimble
Triplett
Troy
Truesdale

U

Union
Union Star
Unionville
University City
Urbana
Urich

V

Valley Park
Van Buren
Vandalia
Velda City
Velda Village Hills
Verona
Versailles
Viburnum
Vienna
Village of Four Seasons
Vinita Park

W

Waco
Walker
Walnut Grove
Wappapello Lake
Wardell
Wardsville
Warrensburg
Warrenton
Warsaw
Warson Woods
Washburn
Washington
Wasola
Waverly
Wayland
Waynesville
Weatherby Lake
Weaubleau
Webb City
Webster Groves
Weldon Spring
Wellington
Wellston
Wellsville
Wentzville
West Alton
Westboro
Weston
Westphalia
West Plains
Wheatland
Wheaton
Wheeling
Wildwood
Willard
Williamsville
Willow Springs
Winchester
Windsor
Winfield
Winona
Woods Heights
Woodson Terrace
Wright City
Wyaconda
Wyatt

See also
List of municipalities in Missouri
List of villages in Missouri

References

 Official Manual State of Missouri 2005-2006. Issued by the Secretary of State. Jefferson City, Missouri.

External links
 Cities and Municipalities in Missouri
 Missouri Municipal League

Missouri, List of cities in
Cities